OBI Pharma, Inc. is a bio-pharmaceutical company, based in Nangang District, Taipei, Taiwan.

History 
This company was formerly a subsidiary of Optimer Pharmaceuticals.

On 9 Feb 2007, its parent company Optimer Pharmaceuticals can buy/sell on Nasdaq Stock Exchange. At that time, its share price was USD 8.50 per share.

On 15 May 2012, OBI Pharma, Inc. was approved to become a public company in Taiwan.

On 23 Mar 2015, it can do transaction formally on OTC in Taiwan R.O.C.

References
Optimer Pharmaceuticals

Biotechnology companies of Taiwan
Biotechnology companies established in 2002
Companies based in Taipei
Taiwanese companies established in 2002